The Croat Theatre of Pécs is the professional theatre of Croat minority in Pécs, Hungary.

History 
The Croat Theatre of Pécs is the first self-initiative institution of Croats in Hungary. It was founded in 1990 by Antun Vidaković, after years of work and organization, with the support of local Croat intellectuals like Ivica Đurok, Mišo Balaž or Đuro Franković, and Magyars like Zoltán Bachmann, János Erdős, or László Bükkösdi. Convincing local and national authorities, support was gathered to fund the mission. The theatre premiered in 1990 with the play Kraljevo by Krleža.
Vidaković still manages the institution, which operates as a complete theater since 1998.

Cast & crew 
Most of the contributors are Croats, but there are also Magyars.
 Velimir Čokljat
 István Gyurity, actor
 Damir Lončar
 Jozo Matorić
 Vlasta Ramljak
 Slaven Vidaković
 Stjepan Filaković, theatre director
 László Bogassy
 Slaven Vidaković

Events 
The theatre organizes summer games since 2002.

Sources

External links 
 Official homepage of the theatre 

Theatres in Pécs
Croats of Hungary
Pécs
Organisations based in Pécs
1990 establishments in Hungary